Raw Comedy is an Australian annual competition for emerging stand-up comedians held by Melbourne International Comedy Festival. It was established in 1996 and is supported by national youth radio station Triple J. In 2011, there were 1,100 contestants.

Heats take place in major Australian cities through January, February and March. State semi-finals and finals are held in the state capitals in March. The final is held as part of the Melbourne International Comedy Festival in April and televised on ABC.

The winner of Raw Comedy is sent to the So You Think You're Funny competition at the Edinburgh Festival Fringe. Three Raw Comedy winners, Drew Rokos, Nick Sun and Demi Lardner have gone on to win So You Think You're Funny.

Past winners and finalists

References

External links

Awards established in 1996
Australian comedy awards